Karwinskia humboldtiana, commonly known as coyotillo, cacachila or Humboldt coyotillo, is a species of flowering shrub or small tree in the family Rhamnaceae.  It is native to southern and western Texas in the United States as well as much of Mexico.  The seeds and leaves of this plant contain the quinones eleutherin and 7-methoxyeleutherin and chrysophanol and β-amyrin in the fruits that are toxic to humans and livestock. The toxins typically induce paralysis, which is often followed by death. However, it often takes days or even weeks after consumption for the symptoms to manifest.

References

humboldtiana
Plants described in 1819
Flora of Mexico
Flora of Texas
Taxa named by Joseph Gerhard Zuccarini